Police Sports Club is a cricket team in Sri Lanka that has played first-class cricket since the 1995–96 season.

Home ground

Police Sports Club's home ground is Police Park Ground in Colombo. The ground has hosted cricket matches since 1973 and is a regular first-class venue. The ground also hosted four Youth ODI matches in 2000 and 2007 and a Youth Test in 2007.

Current squad
Players with international caps are listed in bold. Updated as of 23 July 2022

See also
 List of Sri Lankan cricket teams

References

External links
 Police Sports Club at CricketArchive
 Police Sports Club at CricInfo

1995 establishments in Sri Lanka
Sri Lankan first-class cricket teams
Cricket clubs established in 1995
Police sports clubs